Kaulen is a German surname. Notable people with the surname include:

 Franz Philip Kaulen (1827–1907), German Catholic scriptural scholar
 Hugo Kaulen (1869–1954), German balloonist

See also
 Kallen
 Karlen

German-language surnames